LGBT literature may refer to:

 Lesbian literature
 Gay literature
 Bisexual literature
 Transgender literature
 Or any other literature featuring the LGBT community